Gerdab-e Kebir (also Romanized as Gerdāb-e Kebīr; also known as Gerdāb-e Soflá) is a village in Vahdat Rural District, Mugarmun District, Landeh County, Kohgiluyeh and Boyer-Ahmad Province, Iran. At the 2006 census, its population was 158, in 27 families.

References 

Populated places in Landeh County